Carlos Ignacio Urrea Arbeláez (born 1 January 1966) is the 10th and current Ambassador of Colombia to China. Before his diplomatic appointment he served in the private sector as President of Leonisa.

Ambassadorship
On 7 March 2011 President Juan Manuel Santos Calderón announced the designation of Urrea as Ambassador Extraordinary and Plenipotentiary of Colombia to China replacing Guillermo Ricardo Vélez, and called it a "luxury designation". Urrea was sworn in on 19 May in a ceremony at the Palace of Nariño, and presented his Letters of Credence to Hu Jintao, President of the People's Republic of China, on 11 August at the Great Hall of the People in Beijing.

See also
 Dicken Fernando Panesso Serna

References

1966 births
Living people
People from Medellín
IE University alumni
Colombian businesspeople
Ambassadors of Colombia to China